Hotarionomus blattoides is a species of beetle in the family Cerambycidae. It was described by Francis Polkinghorne Pascoe in 1856, originally under the genus Monohammus. It is known from Malaysia and Indonesia.

Subspecies
 Hotarionomus blattoides blattoides is a species of beetle in the family Cerambycidae. It was described by Francis Polkinghorne Pascoe in 1856, originally under the genus Monohammus. It is known from Malaysia and Indonesia.

≈Scientific synonyms≈
–Monohammus blattoides Pascoe, 1856 o
–Otarionomus blattoides (Pascoe, 1856) (unjustified emendation)

≈Explanations≈
o original combination
u.em. unjustified emendation - proposed alternative spelling of scientific name when not justified by international code of nomenclature

≈References≈
https://www.biolib.cz/en/taxon/id275316/
https://en.m.wikipedia.org/wiki/Hotarionomus_blattoides

References

Lamiini
Beetles described in 1856